Geumseong is a dong, or precinct, in Geumjeong-gu, Busan, South Korea.  A lightly populated district, it is situated entirely within the mountain range of Geumjeongsan.  It is bounded to the west by Hwamyeong-dong and Geumgok-dong in Buk District, to the northwest by Dong-myeon of Yangsan City, to the east by Cheongnyong-dong, Namsan-dong, Guseo-dong, and Jangjeon-dong of Geumjeong-gu, and to the south by Oncheon-dong in Dongnae-gu.  The northernmost point in Geumseong-dong is at Godang-bong, the highest peak in Geumjeongsan.

Geumseong-dong is a rural district connected by public transit to the rest of Busan by bus service only.  Despite covering a comparatively large area, Geumseong-dong is not subdivided into additional "administrative dong" due to its low population.  There are two points of access to the dong where the main road, Sanseong-ro, connects to Hwamyeong-dong in the west, and Jangjeon-dong in the east.  The only major area of settlement within the dong is in the village of Sanseong-myeon (literally "mountain fortress village").

The name Geumseong derives from Geumjeongsanseong, a large mountain fortress built in 1703 that is located largely within the dong.

See also
Geography of South Korea
Administrative divisions of South Korea

References

Geumjeong District
Neighbourhoods in Busan